VBL or Vbl may refer to:

 VBL (inbrafiltro), a Brazilian armoured vehicle
 Véhicule Blindé Léger, a French armoured vehicle
 Verkehrsbetriebe Luzern, the public transport operator for Lucerne, Switzerland
 Vasabladet, a Swedish-language newspaper published in Vaasa, Finland

See also
 VBI (disambiguation)